The Tamale Sports Stadium is a multipurpose stadium in Tamale, Ghana, mostly used for football matches as well as a place for hosting events and serves as the home stadium of Real Tamale United, Tamale City FC and Steadfast FC. The stadium which hosted some matches during the 2008 African Cup of Nations has a capacity of about 20,000 and it was completed in 2008 by the Shanghai Construction Group of China. The stadium looks similar to the Sekondi-Takoradi Stadium.

In December 2017, Tamale Sports Stadium was renamed Aliu Mahama Sports Stadium after the late Aliu Mahama, the former Vice President of Ghana.

Gallery

References

External links
 Ghana-pedia website - Tamale Stadium

Tamale, Ghana
Football venues in Ghana
Sports venues in Ghana
Multi-purpose stadiums in Ghana
Dagbon